is a waterfall in the city of Shinshiro, Aichi Prefecture, Japan. It has been protected as both a Place of Scenic Beauty and Natural Monument since 1934.  The waterfalls was named one of "Japan’s Top 100 Waterfalls", in a listing published by the Japanese Ministry of the Environment in 1990.

Overview
The Atera Seven Falls are located on the Atera branch of the Toyokawa River within the Tenryū-Okumikawa Quasi-National Park. As the river flows down from the Nasuyama Plateau, it crosses a conglomerate fault scarp composed of middle and Paleozoic rock gravel such as sandstone, mudstone and granite. The falls are broken into a series of composed of middle and Paleozoic rock gravel such as sandstone, mudstone and granite. The  first waterfall has a height of 9 meters from the bottom. The second is 13 meters, the third is 7 meters, the fourth waterfall is 25 meters, the fifth waterfall is 2 meters, the sixth waterfall is 4 meters, the seventh waterfall is 2 meters, for a total length of 62 meters over a drop in elevation of 26 meters. Only the first four tiers can be seen from below. The force of the falling water has created basins at the base of each fall, especially the second waterfall, which has a depth of 4 meters and the fifth fall which has a depth of 7 meters. 

According to legend, a young onmyōji Abe no Seimei named this waterfall when he came here to meditate during the early Heian period.

See also
List of Places of Scenic Beauty of Japan (Aichi)

References

External links

 Ministry of Environment 
 Aichi Now official site for Aichi Tourism 
Shinshiro city official home page 

Waterfalls of Japan
Landforms of Aichi Prefecture
Tourist attractions in Aichi Prefecture
Shinshiro, Aichi
Places of Scenic Beauty
Natural monuments of Japan